Serrières-en-Chautagne is a commune in the Savoie department in the Auvergne-Rhône-Alpes region in south-eastern France.

Notable people
Joanny Thévenoud (1878-1949), minister in Upper Volta

See also
Communes of the Savoie department

References

Communes of Savoie